Jean Baptiste Plauché (28 January 1785 – 2 January 1860) was a Louisiana soldier and politician. He was Lieutenant Governor of Louisiana, from 1850 to 1853 serving under Governor Joseph M. Walker.

Biography
Jean Baptiste Plauché was born in New Orleans in 1785. His father had immigrated to Louisiana from Marseille, France, when he was 25 and established himself in New Orleans, where he earned a reputation as an "honest and industrious man." His mother was a New Orleans native who was educated at the Ursuline Academy. Jean learned many of the gentlemanly costumes of his day from his mother.

In the Battle of New Orleans, Major Plauché headed the Bataillon d'Orleans militia. He had formed the battalion from five uniformed companies and with the assistance of Senator Edward Livingston. At the time (December 1814 – January 1815), he was just twenty-nine years old. Colonel Andrew Jackson was so impressed with the performance of the Bataillon d'Orleans and Major Plauché that he praised them in a letter before he left the city. After Jackson's retirement from public life, he and Plauche kept up a friendly correspondence. Plauché later rose to the rank of Brigadier General in the Legion of Louisiana.

Jean was married to Mathilde St. Amand (22 October 1791 – 26 October 1840), by whom he had seven children.

Tributes
Camp Plauché, a troop staging area near Harahan, Louisiana, during World War II, was named in his honor.

References

External links
Le Général Jean Baptiste Plauché

United States Army generals
Politicians from New Orleans
1785 births
1860 deaths
People from New Orleans
American people of French descent
American military personnel of the War of 1812